The Seventh Day is a 2021 American horror film written and directed by Justin P. Lange. It stars Guy Pearce, Vadhir Derbez, Stephen Lang and Keith David.

It was released on March 26, 2021, by Vertical Entertainment and Redbox Entertainment.

Premise
Father Peter, a prestigious exorcist, teams up with Father Daniel, a young and inexperienced priest, on his first day of work. They try to stop the demonic possession of a young boy named Charlie.

While performing the exorcism on Charlie and seeing his arms slowly burn, Father Daniel realizes that Father Peter is actually possessed, and in a struggle, Father Daniel kills Father Peter.

Later on, the archbishop and Father Daniel realize every priest who has worked under Father Peter has been possessed by a demon, creating a network of demonic priests that is quite sizable.

Cast
 Guy Pearce as Father Peter Costello
 Chris Galust as young Peter Costello
 Vadhir Derbez as Father Daniel Garcia
 Stephen Lang as Archbishop
 Keith David as Father Louis
 Robin Bartlett as Helen
 Brady Jenness as Charlie Giroux
 Tristan Riggs as Nicholas Miller
 Hannah Alline Culwell as Mrs. Miller
 Heath Freeman as Mr. Miller
 Acoryé White as George

Production
On November 6, 2019, it was announced that Guy Pearce signed on to play the lead role in the film. On January 14, 2020, Vadhir Derbez joined the cast. On January 27, 2020, Stephen Lang, Keith David, Robin Bartlett, Brady Jenness and Chris Galust joined the cast of the film.

Principal photography began on February 5, 2020 in Dallas and New Orleans.

Release
It was released on March 26, 2021, by Vertical Entertainment and Redbox Entertainment.

Reception
On Rotten Tomatoes, the film has an approval rating of 14%, based on reviews from 14 critics, with an average score of 4.10/10. On Metacritic, the film has a weighted average score of 43 out of 100, based on 6 critics, indicating "mixed or average reviews".

Owen Gleiberman of Variety wrote:

References

External links
 

2021 films
American independent films
Demons in film
Films about exorcism
Religious horror films
Films shot in Dallas
Films shot in New Orleans
Vertical Entertainment films
2020s English-language films
2020s American films